Muqabala is a 1942 Indian action drama film directed by Batuk Bhatt and Babubhai Mistri, and starring Fearless Nadia,  Yakub, Agha, Dalpat, Srinivas and Rajni. Batuk Bhatt started his career as a director by co-directing this film and Mauj (1943) and was a name used by Nanabhai Bhatt. The dog Gunboat was also billed in the credit roll of the film and on the posters. The music of the film was composed by Khan Mastana with lyrics by A. Karim. The story revolves around Nadia who plays a double-role of twin sisters separated at birth, one growing up surrounded by luxury and the other brought up by a gangster as a dancer. The romantic interest was provided by Yakub. It is also the first film in India to use the double role format.

Plot
Madhuri and Rani (Baby Madhuri) are twin sisters whose parents, Seth Dinanath and Radha, are shot in front of them by their mother's rejected suitor Shivnath (Dalpat). The mother dies and the father is kept prisoner by Shivnath who also kidnaps Rani. Madhuri is found wandering by a rich man Rai Bahadur, who takes her home and adopts her. Several years pass and Madhuri (Fearless Nadia) is enjoying her life in luxury. She has a dog called Gunboat who accompanies her everywhere. She finds out about her parents and sees Rani dance at a nightclub. She vows vengeance and soon the sisters along with two friends (Yakub and Agha) fight their way to the gangster and free their father.

Cast
Fearless Nadia as Madhuri/Rani
Yakoob as Niranjan
Shreenivas as Ramesh
Rajni as Bina
Dalpat	as Shivnath
Agha as Ramu
Nazira as Bijli
Baby Madhuri as Young Madhuri/Rani
M. K. Hasan as Raibahadur Biharilal
Jal Khambata as Dinanath
Khan Mastana as Singer at Club
A. Rehman as Bhado
Kunzru
Azim as Savan
Habib as Bijli's Brother
Dog Gunboat

Soundtrack
Khan Mastana, also known as Hafeez Khan Mastana, acted in the film and composed the music, with lyrics written by A. Karim. The songs were sung by Yakub, Srinivas, Rajni, Nazira, Khan Mastana and Agha.

Song list

References

External links
 
 Muqabala (1942) on YouTube

1942 films
1940s Hindi-language films
Films scored by Khan Mastana
Indian action drama films
Twins in Indian films
1940s action drama films
Indian black-and-white films
Films directed by Babubhai Mistry
1942 drama films